Kim Bo-hyon (3 October 1871 – 2 September 1955) was a farmer from the South Pyongan province. He was the paternal grandfather of the founder of the Democratic People's Republic of Korea, Kim Il-sung, the great-grandfather of Kim Jong-il, and great-great-grandfather of the current leader of North Korea, Kim Jong-un.

He was buried in the revolutionary Martyrs cemetery in North Korea.

Biography
Kim Bo-hyon was born on 3 October 1871 as the only son to Mangyongdae farmer Kim Ung-u (June 17, 1848-October 4, 1878). Kim Ung-u died at the age of thirty, one day after Kim Bo-hyon's seventh birthday. Without his father, Kim went to live with his uncle.

In his twenties, Bo-Hyon married a girl named Lee Bo-ik, who was five years younger than Kim. Together, they had three sons and three daughters, the most well known of the offspring being Kim Hyong-jik. To feed his six offspring, Kim was said to have woken up at early dawn and went around the village to collect manure, while at night, he was said to twist straw ropes, make straw sandals and plait straw mats by lamplight.

Kim Il-sung claimed his ancestors, including his grandfather Kim Bo-hyon and great-grandfather Kim Ung-u, were involved in the General Sherman incident, despite the fact that Kim Bo-hyun was not born until five years later. The account, undisputed in North Korea, has been questioned by independent scholars abroad.

Legacy
Kim Bo-hyon and Lee Bo-ik were likened as "patriots" by the Editorial Committee for the Short Biography of Kim Il-sung.

On 19 August 2013, wreaths were sent by various North Korean organizations to the tombs of Kim Bo-hyon and Lee Bo-ik.

Family

 Father: Kim Ung-u (김응우; 17 June 1848 – 4 October 1878)
 Grandfather: Kim Song-ryeong (김송령; 1 December 1810 – 12 March 1899)
 Grandmother: Na Hyon-jik (나현직; 4 March 1811 – 23 January 1897)
 Mother: Lady Lee (이씨)
 Wife: Lee Bo-ik (이보익; 31 May 1876 – 18 October 1958)
Son: Kim Hyeong-jik (김형직; 10 July 1894 – 5 June 1926)
Son: Kim Hyeong-rok (김형록)
Son: Kim Hyeong-gwon (김형권; 4 November 1905 – 12 January 1936)
Daughter: Kim Gu-il (김구일)
Daughter: Kim Hyeong-sil (김형실)
Daughter: Kim Hyeong-bok (김형복)

References

1871 births
1955 deaths
Korean independence activists
Korean communists
Korean revolutionaries
Kim dynasty (North Korea)